Murlough Nature Reserve lies on the coast of County Down in Northern Ireland, situated close to Newcastle. It has views of Slieve Donard, the highest peak in the Mourne Mountains and Dundrum Bay. Its 6,000-year-old sand dune system has been managed by the National Trust since 1967, when it became Ireland's first nature reserve. Grid ref: J414351.

Features
At 697 acres, it is the most extensive example of dune heath within Ireland, with a network of paths and boardwalks through the dunes. Breeding birds include meadow pipit, Eurasian skylark, common cuckoo, European stonechat, common linnet and common reed bunting.  Shorehauling grey seal and common seals are also common in the area. Between 50 and 130 common and grey seals regularly use the area for moulting, resting and feeding. Rare plants local to the site are pyramidal orchid and carline thistle.

It also has access to a shingle beach and four mile Blue Flag strand.

History
In 1857, the 4th Marquess of Downshire built Murlough House as a summer residence on the peninsula. They built a wooden bridge connecting to Keel Point, replaced in 1893 with the current granite one.

The house and sand dunes were extensively used by the US Army during the Second World War. In 1942 the US 1st Battalion, 13th Armored (1st Division) arrived followed by the 818th Tank Destroyer Battalion (XV Corps) in April 1944.

Moths and butterflies

Several rare moths and butterflies can be found within the reserve. Of the 23 butterfly species recorded at Murlough, the marsh fritillary (Euphydryas aurinia), is of European importance - other notable species include dark-green fritillary (Argynnis aglaja), grayling (Hipparchia semele) and cryptic wood white (Leptidea juvernica). One species, the wall brown butterfly (Lasiommata megera) has not been recorded for several years and is considered extinct at this site. 
Over 750 species of moth have been recorded within the boundary of Murlough Nature Reserve, more than at any other site in Northern Ireland - examples include small elephant hawkmoth (Deilephila porcellus), sand dart (Agrotis ripae) and the micro moths Pyrausta cingulata and Hysterophora maculosana. A total of 775 Lepidoptera (butterflies and moths) have been recorded within the nature reserve boundary.

Notable migrant species noted in the area have included: cosmopolitan (Leucania loreyi), tawny pinion (Lithophane semibrunnea), double line (Mythimna turca), white-speck, the delicate and L-album wainscot

In 2012 a Stephens' gem (Megalographa biloba) was recorded at Murlough NNR - this was the 1st record for Ireland of this North American moth species.

Gallery

References

External links
Virtual tour of Murlough Nature Reserve - Virtual Visit Northern Ireland
Murlough Nature Reserve on the National Trust website

Geography of County Down
Nature reserves in Northern Ireland
Protected areas of County Down
National Trust properties in Northern Ireland